Kánó is a village in Borsod-Abaúj-Zemplén County in northeastern Hungary.
Before the Holocaust, few Jewish families lived in the village.

References

Populated places in Borsod-Abaúj-Zemplén County